Jari Juhani Lindroos (born 31 January 1961 in Pieksämäki, Finland) is a retired professional ice hockey player who played in the SM-liiga. He played for JYP, Jokerit and Kärpät and competed with the Finland national ice hockey team at the 1992 Winter Olympics. He was inducted into the Finnish Hockey Hall of Fame in 2005.

Career statistics

Regular season and playoffs

International

References

1961 births
Living people
Finnish ice hockey players
Ice hockey players at the 1992 Winter Olympics
Jokerit players
JYP Jyväskylä players
Olympic ice hockey players of Finland
Oulun Kärpät players
People from Pieksämäki
Sportspeople from South Savo